"I Feel You" is the sixth single from British singer-songwriter Peter Andre's second studio album, Natural (1996). The track spent one week at number one on the UK Singles Chart in 1996, becoming Andre's second number one in succession, and was the first number-one hit for co-writer Goldsmith who also co-wrote Andre's single "Mysterious Girl".

Critical reception
A reviewer from Music Week rated the song four out of five, adding that "Andre gets mellow on a strong, sweet ballad. Radio will love it, as will his teen fans. Adult soul fans may come on board, too."

Track listings
 UK CD1
 "I Feel You" (radio edit)
 "I Feel You" (The Ruby Centre mix)
 "You Are" (Part 1)
 "I Feel You" (Cruisin' mix)

 UK CD2
 "I Feel You" (radio edit)
 "I Feel You" (Mark Crypt Lewis mix)
 "Oh Girl" ("Only One"—original pop mix '93)
 "I Feel You" (piano version)

 UK cassette single and European CD single
 "I Feel You" (radio edit)
 "Take Me Back"

Charts

Weekly charts

Year-end charts

References

1990s ballads
1995 songs
1996 singles
Mushroom Records singles
Peter Andre songs
Song recordings produced by Cutfather & Joe
Songs written by Glen Goldsmith
Songs written by Peter Andre
UK Singles Chart number-one singles